Todd Valley (also, Todd) is an unincorporated community in Placer County, California. It lies at an elevation of 2684 feet (818 m).

The name honors Dr. F. Walton Todd, who opened a store there in 1849. The Todd Valley post office operated from 1856 to 1884. The Todd post office operated from 1885 to 1901.

References

Unincorporated communities in California
Unincorporated communities in Placer County, California
1849 establishments in California